is a Japanese judoka. He is the son of 1992 Olympic silver medalist Naoya Ogawa.

He participated at the 2018 World Judo Championships, winning a medal.

References

External links
 

1996 births
Living people
Japanese male judoka
Sportspeople from Kanagawa Prefecture
World judo champions
20th-century Japanese people
21st-century Japanese people